Krejčík (feminine Krejčíková) is a Czech-language occupational surname, meaning 'tailor'.

The surname may refer to:

 Aneta Krejčíková (born 1991), Czech actress
 Barbora Krejčíková (born 1995), Czech tennis player
 Jiří Krejčík (1918–2013), Czech film director
 Jakub Krejčík (born 1991), Czech ice hockey player
 Josef Krejcik (1885–1957), Austrian chess master and writer
 Lukáš Krejčík (born 1990), Czech ice hockey player
 Stanislav Krejčík (born 1972), Czech footballer

See also
 
 

Occupational surnames
Czech-language surnames